This is a list of notable events in the history of LGBT rights that took place in the year 1970.

Events

March 

 8 — Police, led by Seymour Pine of the Stonewall raid the year before, raide an illegal gay bar called the Snake Pit in Greenwich Village. Over 160 people are arrested.
 17 — The film The Boys in the Band premieres in New York City.

April 

 7— Midnight Cowboy, the first major Hollywood film to feature a same-sex sexual encounter between two men, wins the Oscar for Best Picture. 
 7 — John Schlesinger wins Best Director at the Academy Awards.
 13 — John Lindsay, the Mayor of New York City, was confronted by protestors from the Gay Activist Alliance at the Metropolitan Opera House.

May 

 9 — A high school teacher named Ingrid Mykle Montano in Phoenix, Arizona, is forced to resign after parents complain about her inviting a gay man to speak in one of her sociology classes.
 21— Bella Abzug speaks at a Gay Activist Alliance meeting, becoming the first politician to court the LGBT community's votes in the United States.

June 

 12 — Lesbians Neva Joy Heckmann and Judith Ann Belew marry in Los Angeles.
24 — The Rockefeller Five, five activists from the Gay Activists Alliance, are arrested during a sit-in at the Republican Senate Committee headquarters.
27 — Chicago holds the first LGBT Pride parade the USA
28 — On the one-year anniversary of the Stonewall riots, what started out as a march on Christopher Street in New York City of a few hundred people turned into thousands of people ending in Central Park. It brought gay and lesbian individuals together to demonstrate that they were a sizable minority population.

July 

 1 — The Gay Liberation Task Force meets for the first time at the American Library Association Annual Conference in Detroit, Michigan.

September
 5 — Colombia changes "homosexual behavior" from a felony into a misdemeanor, and the maximum penalty is reduced to three years.

November
 London gay activists hold the first meeting of the London incarnation of the Gay Liberation Front.

See also

Timeline of LGBT history — timeline of events from 12,000 BCE to present
LGBT rights by country or territory — current legal status around the world
LGBT social movements

Notes

References
 Miller, Neil (1995). Out of the Past: Gay and Lesbian History from 1869 to the Present. New York, Vintage Books. .

LGBT rights by year
1970 in LGBT history